Koo Tsai Kee (born 29 November 1954) is a Singaporean associate professor and former politician. He was a Member of Parliament from 1991 to 2011, representing the Tiong Bahru division under the Tanjong Pagar Group Representation Constituency (Tanjong Pagar GRC).

Education
Koo was educated in Raffles Institution. He holds a Bachelor of Surveying with first class honours from the universities of Newcastle and New South Wales. He also attended University College London and has a Graduate Diploma in photogrammetry, Master of Science and Master of Philosophy.

Political career
Koo entered politics in 1991, when he was elected via walkover as a Member of Parliament (MP) for Tanjong Pagar Group Representation Constituency (Tanjong Pagar GRC).

Koo has held the position of Parliamentary Secretary in various ministries, including Finance, National Development, Defence, and Environment and Water Resources. Koo was promoted to Minister of State in the Ministry of Defence in May 2006.

Koo is an associate professor at Nanyang Technological University (NTU), and has been on no-pay leave since 1999.

References

1954 births
Living people
University of Newcastle (Australia) alumni
University of New South Wales alumni
Raffles Junior College alumni
Alumni of University College London
Academic staff of Nanyang Technological University
People's Action Party politicians
Members of the Parliament of Singapore